The Reform and Renaissance Party is an Islamist political party in Egypt.

History and profile
The party was established on 18 July 2011. Hesham Mustafa Abdel Aziz is the leader of the party.

The party announced on 6 April 2014 that it would form a shadow government. The party accepted the protests that started on 30 June 2013. The party met with the Justice Party to discuss potential alliances for the 2015 Egyptian parliamentary election. The party announced on 4 July 2014 that it also met with the Reform and Development Party to discuss coordination. Members of the Egyptian Social Democratic Party met with party members to discuss cooperation between the parties during the 2014 parliamentary elections.

Lawsuit against Islamic parties 
The Reform and Renaissance Party is one of the eleven Islamic parties targeted by a lawsuit in November 2014, when an organization named Popular Front for opposing the Brotherhoodization of Egypt sought to dissolve all political parties established "on a religious basis." The Alexandria Urgent Matters Court however ruled on 26 November 2014 that it lacked jurisdiction.

References

External links
 

2011 establishments in Egypt
Islamic political parties in Egypt
Political parties established in 2011
Political parties in Egypt